Big Bug Man is an unreleased American animated television film starring Brendan Fraser and Marlon Brando. The film is a Studio-Free Studios Production, and it was originally to be released between 2006 and 2008, but was never released or distributed. The film is Marlon Brando's last known film work.

The film is written by Bob Bendetson, who also wrote episodes for the TV show The Simpsons. It is directed by Bendetson and Peter Shin.

Plot
Candy company worker Howard Kind (Brendan Fraser) gains special abilities after being bitten by insects.

Production
The film is hand-drawn. The production of the film cost approximately US$20 million.

Marlon Brando during the production
Brando was originally asked to be the voice of Nicholas Dunderbeck, but Brando thought it would be fun to voice the old lady Mrs. Sour instead.

Mrs. Sour is only in three scenes, so it took only one day to record the voice of this character. According to the director Bob Bendetson, Brando wore a blond wig, a dress, white gloves, and full makeup while recording the voice of  Mrs. Sour. Bendetson believes this was part humorous, and part wanting to get into character. Bendetson said "About halfway through he took off the wig because he was getting too hot." According to the film's executive producer Gabriel Grunfeld, Brando described the part as "the most fun I've had since playing Julius Caesar." Grunfeld said that even though Brando was frail, he was full of energy and invention.

The recording took place in Marlon Brando's home, on June 10, 2004. By this point in his life, Brando was on oxygen six hours a day. He died the next month, on July 1, 2004.

Characters

 Howard Kind - Voiced by Brendan Fraser. A soft and unfortunate employee of the candy factory, who accidentally gets bitten by bugs, and becomes the Big Bug Man 
 Mrs. Sour - Voiced by Marlon Brando. The founder, leader and matriarch of the big and corrupt Mrs. Sour Candy Company 
 Petfarkin
 Nicholas Dunderbeck - runs the Mrs. Sour Candy Company
 Elle Rose
 Sidney Looper
 Seen It All Jackson
 Heard It All Jackson - a dog

Michael Madsen also lent his voice to the movie, in an unspecified role.

References

External links

Unreleased American films
American superhero films
American television films
American animated films
Animated films about insects
2000s unfinished films
Unfinished animated films
2000s English-language films
2000s American films